The Butts Spur was a freight railway line constructed around 1860 with the aim of linking Worcester Foregate Street railway station to Diglis where the Worcester and Birmingham canal joined the river Severn. From around 1892 the line was worked by a small wheeled 0-6-0 saddle tank locomotive No. 2007 constructed in Wolverhampton. It was hoped that goods arriving at Diglis from the river Severn would be transhipped to the railway. The line was used by Dent's factory and Stallards's distillery and brought cattle to the cattle market.   

It descended from Foregate street station on a viaduct to the north side of the Worcester to Hereford rail line into a headshunt where the locomotive would reverse direction. The train continued its journey under the Worcester to Hereford railway viaduct via the east bank of the river Severn under Worcester bridge, at the time referred to as Gwynne's bridge, towards Worcester cathedral. 

The line's construction did not achieve its aim of reaching Diglis, instead finishing adjacent to Dent's factory and Stallard's Distillery which at the time were located on South Quay. This was due Worcester cathedral authorities objecting to a railway running between the cathedral and River Severn.  With the rebuilding of the Worcester road bridge in 1931, the track was truncated to the north side of the bridge. The line was closed and the track removed in 1957.

Traces of the line remain visible in the descending gradient of the viaduct arches which are currently used as commercial and storage units.

External links
 Former Route of the Butts Spur Railway in 1930
 Historic photographs of the Butts Spur Railway
 Historic photographs of the Butts Spur Railway in an article on Worcester Skywalk bridge

References

Worcester, England
Rail transport in Worcestershire
Closed railway lines